Ely Shipley is an author and poet who has been featured in multiple literary journals. He has additionally published his own works and has received several awards for those works.

Biography 
Ely Shipley received an MFA from Purdue University and a PhD from the University of Utah. He is currently a professor at Western Washington University. He was previously an assistant professor at Baruch College.

Awards and appearances 
Ely Shipley has been nominated and received several awards for his publications. For Boy with Flowers, published by The Barrow Street Press in 2008, he won the Barrow Street Press book prize. He also won the 2009 Thom Gunn Award and several prizes from different publications. He was a finalist for the Lambda Literary Award for Boy with Flowers. He has also received the Western Humanities Review Award in Poetry from the Prairie Schooner for his works. He has been featured at multiple events, including at Cornell University and Stanford University.

Publications

Poetry 
Boy with Flowers (2008)
On Beards: A Memoir of Passing (2015)
Some Animal (2018)

References

Living people
Year of birth missing (living people)
Place of birth missing (living people)
Purdue University alumni
University of Utah alumni
Western Washington University faculty
Baruch College faculty
21st-century American poets
American LGBT poets
Transgender men
American transgender writers